, or SDP for short, is a three-member Japanese hip-hop group that formed in 1988 and debuted in 1990.

History 
The group consists of two MCs, Bose and Ani, and one DJ, Shinco.  Scha Dara Parr is often compared to rap trio the Beastie Boys due to their similar lyrical stylings, presence, and music. When pushed to describe the rebelliousness of their music, the group commented that many of their songs are simply fragments of conversation without polite words.

The group is best known for their 1994 hit single,  featuring , which attained sales of over 500,000 units. The song is based on samples from En Vogue's 1992 single, "Give It Up, Turn It Loose."

Scha Dara Parr gained minor US recognition by appearing on De La Soul's 1993 album, Buhloone Mindstate. The group rapped in a mixture of mostly Japanese and some English on the track "Long Island Wildin'".

The 1991 single "Game Boyz" (ゲームボーイズ) from the group's second album "Towering Nonsense" (タワリングナンセンス) was featured in the Japanese commercial for The Legend of Zelda: A Link to the Past.

Members
 Ani: Yōsuke Matsumoto (松本洋介) - MC
 Bose: Makoto Kōshima (光嶋誠) - MC
 Shinco: Shinsuke Matsumoto (松本真介) - DJ

Discography

Studio albums
 Scha Dara Daisakusen (1990)
 Towering Nonsense (1991)
 Wild Fancy Alliance (1993)
 5th Wheel 2 The Coach (1995)
 Gūzen no Album (1996)
 fun-key LP (1998)
 Docompact Disc (2000)
 The 9th Sense (2004)
 Con10po (2006)
 11 (2009)
 1212 (2015)

Extended plays
 Scha Dara Gaiden (1994)
 Anishinbou (2016)

Compilation albums
 Potent Hits ~Single Collection~ (1994)
 Toshiba Classic 95-97 (1998)
 CAN YOU COLLABORATE?~best collaboration songs&music clips (2008)
 Best of Schadaraparr 1990-2010 (2010)

Remix albums
 Cycle Hits ~remix Best Collection~ (1995)

References

External links
 Official website
 Profile on Discogs

Musical groups established in 1988
Shibuya-kei musicians
Japanese hip hop groups
Japanese pop music groups
Musical groups from Kanagawa Prefecture